Broken Record is a song by English singer Little Boots from her second studio album, Nocturnes (2013). It was released on 18 March 2013 as the album's third single and official lead single. A limited edition vinyl version of the single was released for Record Store Day on 12-inch white vinyl featuring extended versions of "Broken Record" and "Strangers" titled "Nocturnal Versions". The music video was filmed in March, using clothes from Nordic Poetry and roller skates. The video later premiered on The Guardians website, with the video noted for its roller disco setting and Hesketh's dreamlike line "In your dreams you belong to me". "Broken Record" and "Strangers" were both subsequently made available as free downloads on Little Boots' SoundCloud page.

Track listing
"Broken Record"
"Strangers"

References

2013 singles
2013 songs
Little Boots songs
Songs written by Devrim Karaoglu
Songs written by Little Boots
Songs written by Rick Nowels